James G. Fujimoto is Elihu Thomson Professor of Electrical Engineering and Computer Science at the Massachusetts Institute of Technology (MIT) and a visiting professor of ophthalmology at Tufts University School of Medicine, Boston, Massachusetts.

He received his M.Sc. and Ph.D. from MIT in 1981 and 1984 respectively. He has been part of the MIT faculty since 1985 and is currently Elihu Thomson Professor of Electrical Engineering and Computer Science at MIT and Adjunct Professor of Ophthalmology at Tufts University School of Medicine. He is known for his leading role in the invention of a novel medical imaging modality named optical coherence tomography that is now a standard of care for diagnosis and treatment of several diseases with widespread adoption in ophthalmology.  In addition to his work on OCT he has also contributed to the development of femtosecond lasers.

Professor Fujimoto was elected a member of the National Academy of Engineering in 2001 for pioneering contributions to and commercialization of optical coherence tomography (OCT). He is also a fellow of the American Physical Society, the National Academy of Sciences and the American Association for the Advancement of Science. He has published over 400 journal articles.

Awards and honors
 2001 Member of the National Academy of Engineering
 2001 Fellow of the American Physical Society
 2001 
 2011 
 2012 Champalimaud Vision Award
 2013 SPIE Britton Chance Biomedical Optics Award
 2014 IEEE Photonics Award
 2015 Frederic Ives Medal
 2017 Russ Prize.

References

External links
 Faculty bio
 Research group page

Year of birth missing (living people)
Living people
MIT School of Engineering faculty
Massachusetts Institute of Technology alumni
Optical coherence tomography
Fellows of the American Physical Society
Fellows of the American Association for the Advancement of Science
Fellows of Optica (society)
Optical engineers
Electrical engineering academics
American electrical engineers
American academics of Japanese descent